The Reverse Prince Albert piercing (RPA) is a form of male genital piercing.

Characteristics
The reverse Prince Albert piercing enters through the urethra and exits through a hole pierced in the top of the glans. Because it passes through this thicker glans tissue rather than the comparatively thinner membrane between the urethra and the underside of the penis, healing time is substantially longer than the standard Prince Albert piercing.

See also
Prince Albert (genital piercing)
Genital piercing

References

Further reading
 

Penis piercings